Şeyhköy can refer to:

 Şeyhköy, İskilip
 Şeyhköy, Kastamonu